Ingraham Institute is an academic institute in Ghaziabad Uttar Pradesh, India. It was established in 1926.

It is one of the largest institutions of the Methodist Church in India. Ingraham has a Industrial Training Institute as well as a Polytechnic Institute and 12 schools that provide formal education up to the 12th-grade level standard. It offers lessons in both English and Hindi up to the 12th grade. The English medium is affiliated from Indian School Certificate (ISC). Hindi medium is affiliated from Uttar Pradesh State Board. The Ingraham Institute has a city branch which provides education up to 10th standard, and it is affiliated with C.B.S.E. The school has a branch also for hearing-impaired students.

In 1919, F.M. North, an American missionary, conceived of educational / vocational institutes in India to train the marginalized young people. The land for the school was purchased from Ghaziabad. A Teacher's Training School and a small dispensary was started on this land.

External links 
Official website

Methodist schools in India
Christian schools in Uttar Pradesh
High schools and secondary schools in Uttar Pradesh
Schools in Ghaziabad, Uttar Pradesh
Educational institutions established in 1926
1926 establishments in India